Luke Collis (born July 27, 1988) is an American football quarterback for the Georgia Doom of the American Arena League (AAL). He signed with the Spokane Shock as an undrafted free agent in 2012. He played college football at the Occidental College after transferring out of University of Nevada, Reno. He has also been a member of the Chicago Rush, Knoxville NightHawks, San Angelo Bandits, Tampa Bay Storm, Philadelphia Soul and Beijing Lions.

College career
After attending  Saint Francis High School, Collis accepted a scholarship to play football at the University of Nevada in 2007. At Nevada, Collis was an Academic All-WAC honoree in 2009.  After redshirting his freshman year, and playing behind Colin Kaepernick as a redshirt freshman and sophomore, Collis announced that he would transfer to Occidental College on January 7, 2010. Collis became a two-year starter and captain for the Occidental Tigers, and was named 2nd Team All-Southern California Intercollegiate Athletic Conference as a junior, and 1st Team All-SCIAC as a senior.  As a senior, Collis ranked 3rd nationally in passing completions per game (27), 7th nationally in passing yards per game (305), and 5th nationally total passing touchdowns (28 in 9 games).

Professional career

Spokane Shock
After going undrafted in the 2012 NFL Draft, Collis was assigned to the Spokane Shock of the Arena Football League (AFL). Collis finished the season with no passes thrown, but achieved 3 tackles.

Chicago Rush
Collis joined the Chicago Rush during the 2013 season, but saw very limited playing time.

Knoxville NightHawks
During 2013, Collis signed with the Knoxville NightHawks of the Professional Indoor Football League (PIFL). Although Collis served as the backup for most of the season, he won the starting quarterback position by the end of the year.

San Angelo Bandits
Collis signed with the San Angelo Bandits of the Lone Star Football League (LSFL) for 2014. He became the starter for the Bandits during Week 3 of the regular season. Collis dominated, throwing 88 touchdowns and  just 7 interceptions in 11 games, and was eventually named the league player of the year.  Over one three game stretch, San Angelo scored 273 points, including one game where Collis threw 12 touchdown passes and the Bandits scored a league record 107 points.  The Bandits went on to win the LSFL Championship.

Tampa Bay Storm
Following the LSFL season, Collis signed with the Tampa Bay Storm of the AFL at the beginning of the AFL's free agency period, on September 26, 2014. Following training camp, Collis was named the backup to Jason Boltus.

Philadelphia Soul
Collis signed with the Philadelphia Soul on November 19, 2015. He was the backup to Dan Raudabaugh during the 2016 season as the Soul won ArenaBowl XXIX. In 2017, he was the backup to Raudabaugh as the Soul won ArenaBowl XXX.

Beijing Lions
Collis was selected by the Beijing Lions in the 20th round of the 2016 CAFL Draft, joining his Soul head coach Clint Dolezel in  Beijing. Collis was the starting quarterback for the Lions during the 2016 season and helped Beijing finish the season undefeated and win the first China Bowl. Collis completed 65.9% of his passes for 1,381 yards, 29 touchdowns and three interceptions, earning All-Pro North Division All-Star honors. He was listed on the Lions' roster for the 2018 season.

Georgia Doom
Collis currently plays for the Georgia Doom.

AFL statistics

Stats from ArenaFan:

References

External links

Occidental bio 
Arena Football League bio

1988 births
Living people
American football quarterbacks
Nevada Wolf Pack football players
Occidental Tigers football players
Spokane Shock players
Knoxville NightHawks players
San Angelo Bandits players
Tampa Bay Storm players
Players of American football from Pasadena, California
Chicago Rush players
Philadelphia Soul players
Beijing Lions players
American Arena League players